Mesothen aurantiaca is a moth of the subfamily Arctiinae. It was described by Paul Dognin in 1906. It is found in Peru.

References

 Natural History Museum Lepidoptera generic names catalog

Mesothen (moth)
Moths described in 1906